Healed by Metal is the 18th studio album by German heavy metal band Grave Digger, which was released on 13 January 2017 via Napalm Records. This is the first album to feature new keyboardist Marcus Kniep as The Reaper since H.P. Katzenburg's departure in 2014.

A lyric video was made for "Call for War" and a music video was made for "Healed by Metal".

Track listing

Personnel
 Chris Boltendahl – vocals
 Axel Ritt – guitars
 Jens Becker – bass
 Stefan Arnold – drums
 Marcus Kniep – keyboards

Additional musicians
 Hacky Hackman – backing vocals
 Frank Konrad – backing vocals
 Andreas von Lipinski – backing vocals

Production
 Chris Boltendahl – producer, lyrics, cover concept
 Axel Ritt – producer, recording (guitars)
 Gyula Havancsák – artwork, cover art
 Jörg Umbreit – producer, engineering, recording, mixing, mastering
 Jens Howorka – photography

Charts

References

Grave Digger (band) albums
2017 albums
Napalm Records albums